The discography of Shai Hulud, a hardcore punk band from Pompano Beach, Florida consists of 4 studio albums, 3 split albums, 2 compilation albums, 1 extended plays, 1 single and 1 video album.

Studio albums

Extended plays

Singles

Splits

Compilations

Video albums

Demos

Appearances

Music videos 
My Heart Bleeds the Darkest Blood, 1997 Crisis/Revelation Records
Misanthropy Pure, 2008 Metal Blade Records
Colder Than The Cold World, 2015 No Sleep Records

References 

Discography
Discographies of American artists
Punk rock group discographies